Deuce Carter (born 28 September 1990) is a Jamaican athlete competing in the sprint hurdles. He represented his country at the 2016 Summer Olympics reaching the semifinals.

His personal best in the 110 metres hurdles is 13.20 seconds (+0.2 m/s) set in Kingston in 2016.

Competition record

References

1990 births
Living people
Jamaican male hurdlers
Athletes (track and field) at the 2016 Summer Olympics
Olympic athletes of Jamaica